Callahan is an Irish surname, anglicized from Ó Ceallacháin. Those bearing it include:

In military 
John H. Callahan, Civil War soldier and Medal of Honor recipient

In sports 
Ben Callahan, baseball player
Bill Callahan (football coach), American football coach
Bryce Callahan, American football player
Gerry Callahan, sports writer
Henry Callahan, ultimate (frisbee) player
Jamie Callahan, American baseball player
Joe Callahan, American football player
Nixey Callahan, baseball player and manager
Ryan Callahan, hockey player
Viviana Callahan Vargas (born 1980), Chilean ski mountaineer

In politics and law 
Bob Callahan, Canadian politician
Consuelo Callahan, American judge
Deb Callahan, former president of the League of Conservation Voters
Dennis Callahan, ran in the 2006 Maryland county executive elections
Donald A. Callahan, 1938 Republican nominee for the U.S. Senate seat in Idaho
Ed Callahan, former Chairman of the National Credit Union Administration (NCUA)
James Yancy Callahan, former Delegate from the Oklahoma Territory to the U.S. House of Representatives
John B. Callahan, mayor of Bethlehem, Pennsylvania
Joseph R. Callahan (1892–1977), American politician, farmer, and businessman
Michael J. Callahan (New York politician) (1858–1902), American saloonkeeper and politician
Laura Callahan, former senior director at the U.S. Department of Homeland Security
Sonny Callahan, former member of the U.S. House of Representatives for Mobile, Alabama
Victor Callahan, American politician

In music 
Bill Callahan (musician), US-American singer-songwriter
Mat Callahan,  US-American musician, author, songwriter, activist, music producer and engineer
Sam Callahan, English singer

In show business 
Bill Callahan (producer), producer and writer of Scrubs
John Callahan (actor), actor in All My Children
Noel Callahan, actor in Romeo!
Dennis Callahan, choreographer
Mars Callahan, actor, director, producer and writer
E. J. Callahan, actor, known for his roles in Wild Wild West (1999) and Friends

Others 
Americus Callahan, American inventor
Daniel Callahan, American philosopher
David Callahan, American writer
Gene Callahan
Harry Callahan (photographer), American photographer
Jason Callahan, former unidentified decedent
John Callahan (disambiguation)
John Ross Callahan, American dental researcher
Kenneth Callahan, American artist
North Callahan, American historian
William P. Callahan, American Roman Catholic bishop

As a given name
Callahan Bright, American football player
Callahan Walsh, son of television personality John Walsh

Calahan
Cody Calahan, Canadian filmmaker
Edward A. Calahan, American inventor
Harold Augustin Calahan, American Navy Lieutenant Commander
Sharon Calahan, American cinematographer

As a given name
Cal O'Reilly, Canadian ice hockey player
Calahan Skogman, American actor and athlete

See also
Ó Ceallacháin
Callaghan (disambiguation)
Callihan
 Callahan Genealogy and History website

References

Anglicised Irish-language surnames
Surnames of Irish origin
Irish families

de:Callahan
fr:Callahan
pl:Callahan